23rd Ruler was an ajaw of the Maya city of Tikal. He ruled in around the year 635. Information about this ajaw and his successor 24th Ruler are scarce. K'inich Muwaan Jol II is estimated to have been 23rd or 24th Ruler because he could have been the father of the 25th ajaw Nuun Ujol Chaak.

Footnotes

References

Year of death unknown
Rulers of Tikal
7th century in the Maya civilization
7th-century monarchs in North America
Year of birth unknown